Engy Ahmed Atya Sayed (born September 4, 1986), shortly Engy Sayed, is an Egyptian footballer who plays as a forward for the Egypt national team.

Playing career

Club 

Engy Sayed was born in Cairo, Egypt on 4 September 4, 1986. Sayed played for the Cairo-based Wadi Degla SC before she moved in November 2017 to Turkey to join Trabzon İdmanocağı, who play in the Turkish Women's First Football League (with jersey number 8).

International career
Sayed appeared for the Egypt women's national football team at the 2016 Africa Women Cup of Nations held in Cameroon.

References

1986 births
Living people
Footballers from Cairo
Women's association football forwards
Egyptian women's footballers
Egypt women's international footballers
Egyptian expatriate footballers
Egyptian expatriate sportspeople in Turkey
Expatriate women's footballers in Turkey
Trabzon İdmanocağı women's players